Redemption Maddie is a 2007 short film directed by Aaron King and stars Allison Scagliotti. The film was completed as part of the American Film Institute Conservatory's MFA Program.

The film began touring the festival circuit in 2007, premiering at the 22nd Annual Santa Barbara International Film Festival.  It has won several awards including a Grand Jury Prize for Student Shorts at the AFI Dallas International Film Festival, Best Short Film and Best Actress at BendFilm Festival, and Best Screenplay at the Hollyshorts Film Festival.  After completing its festival run, Maddie was distributed by Reframe and Amazon for DVD and digital purchase.

The film's official website provides the following description"In the wake of tragedy, 14 year old Maddie Clifford employs manipulation, insulin syringes, and an ill-fated rabbit in a startling quest for redemption."The synopsis highlights an aspect of the film's plot which revolves around the so-called rabbit test, a practice employed to detect pregnancy used in the early twentieth century.

Cast
 Allison Scagliotti as Maddie Clifford
 Kevin Montgomery as Tyler
 Michael Catlin as Mr. Clifford
 Peggy Goss as Mrs. Clifford
 Christopher Dobler as James
 Gisselle Castellanos as Classmate Girl #1
 Jay Collette as Neighbor boy
 Paige Cooper as Nurse Fisher
 Skyler Day as Classmate Girl #2
 Gabi DuBay as Maddie's Classmate
 Kennis Frommel as Baby
 Bella Frommell as Baby
 Chandler M. Guidroz as Doctor
 Steve Humphreys as Mr. Dacey
 Barry Alan Levine as Pet Store Pete
 Stephen Markarian as Henry
 Timothy Mittel as Carl
 Matthew Moseley as Chris
 Judi Rosen Sacks as Nurse
 Alexandria M. Salling as Young Maddie
 Dalton Smith as Winston
 Jennifer Winters as New Wife

References

External links

AFI Dallas 2007 Award Reception
Redemption Maddie Official Website

2007 films
American short films
American independent films
2007 drama films
2000s English-language films
2000s American films